William, Willie, Will, Bill, or Billy Miller may refer to:

Architecture and engineering
William Dawes Miller (1918–1993), American engineer
William Henry Miller (architect) (1848–1922), American architect
William R. Miller (architect) (1866–1929), American architect in Maine

Artists
Bill Miller (artist) (born 1962), American artist
Billy the Artist, East Village-based artist born William Miller
Christian William Miller (1921–1995), American artist and model
William Miller (engraver) (1796–1882), Scottish line engraver
William Rickarby Miller (1818–1893), American painter

Business and industry
Bill Miller (British businessman) (born 1928), former Vice-Chairman of Bristol-Myers Squibb and philanthropist
Bill Miller (investor), chairman and former chief investment officer of Legg Mason Capital Management
William Starr Miller II (1856–1935), New York industrialist in the early 20th century
William White Miller (1846–1912), Irish Canadian businessman

Film, stage, and television
Bill Miller (impresario) (1904–2002), Russian-born American impresario
Bill Miller (film producer) (born 1960), Australian film producer
Billy Miller (actor) (born 1979), American actor, best known for roles on The Young and the Restless and General Hospital
Ranger Bill Miller (1878–1939), American actor
Will Miller (therapist) (born 1949), American ordained minister, Nick at Nite's resident television therapist
William Miller (actor, born 1978), actor based primarily in Spain
William Miller (actor, born 1996), English child actor and footballer
William Miller (sound engineer), British re-recording mixer
William Miller (Almost Famous character), fictional character in the 2000 film Almost Famous

Government

United States
Bill Miller (diplomat), director of the Diplomatic Security Service
G. William Miller (1925–2006), secretary of the treasury and Federal Reserve Board chairman
William Miller (North Carolina politician) (c. 1783–1825), North Carolina governor, 1814–1817
Bill Miller (North Carolina politician) (1929–2022), member of the North Carolina Senate
William Miller (Indiana politician) (1809–1879), member of the Indiana House of Representatives
William Miller (mayor) (1821–1901), mayor of South Bend, Indiana
William Miller (Texas politician), member of the Twenty-first Texas Legislature
William E. Miller (1914–1983), Republican vice presidential nominee in 1964, US congressman
William E. Miller (Iowa judge), Justice of the Iowa Supreme Court
William Ernest Miller (1908–1976), U.S. federal judge
William F. Miller (Wisconsin politician) (1869–?), Wisconsin state assemblyman
William Green Miller (born 1931), United States Ambassador to Ukraine
William H. H. Miller (1840–1917), US Attorney General, 1889–1893
William Henry Miller (legislator) (1829–1870), US congressman from Pennsylvania
William J. Miller (1899–1950), US congressman from Connecticut
William Read Miller (1823–1887), governor of Arkansas
William S. Miller (1793–1854), US congressman from New York

United Kingdom
William Miller, Lord Glenlee (1755–1846), MP for Edinburgh 1790–81, judge in Scotland from 1795 as Lord Glenlee
William Henry Miller (book collector) (1789–1848), MP for Newcastle-under-Lyme
Sir William Miller, 1st Baronet (1809–1887), British Vice-Consul at St. Petersburg, 1842–1854, Member of Parliament for Leith
William Thomas Miller (1865–1930), MP in the Northern Ireland Parliament for Fermanagh and Tyrone and North Tyrone
Bill Miller (Scottish politician) (born 1954), former Labour MEP

Canada
William Miller (Canadian politician) (1835–1912)
William Willoughby Miller (1880–1959), politician in Saskatchewan, Canada

Australia
William Miller (South Australian politician) (1850–1922), Australian politician who represented the electoral district of Burra Burra

Military
William E. Miller (Medal of Honor), Union soldier and Medal of Honor recipient during the American Civil War
William Miller (Peruvian general) (1795–1861), British general known in Latin American as Guillermo Miller, fought beside Simón Bolívar
William Miller (Confederate Army officer) (1820–1909), general in the Confederate States Army during the American Civil War
William Miller (RAF officer) (1892–1962), World War I flying ace

Music
Bill Miller (musician) (born 1955), Grammy Award-winning Native American singer and songwriter
Bill Miller (pianist) (1915–2006), close collaborator with Frank Sinatra
Billy Miller (archivist) (1954–2016), rock 'n' roll collector and archivist
Billy Miller (Australian musician), former member of Australian band The Ferrets
William Miller (American publisher), 19th century music publisher

Religion
William Miller (Australian Presbyterian minister) (1815–1874), served the Free Presbyterian Church of Victoria in Australia
William Miller (missionary) (1838–1923), Free Church of Scotland missionary to Madras and educationalist
William Miller (preacher) (1782–1849), founder of the Millerite Movement
William McElwee Miller (1892–1993), author, Presbyterian minister, missionary to Persia (Iran)

Science and education
William Allen Miller (1817–1870), British chemist after whom the Miller crater is named
William F. Miller (1925–2017), American professor of management and of computer science
William Hallowes Miller (1801–1880), British mineralogist and crystallographer
William Hughes Miller (born 1941), American chemistry professor
William Ian Miller (born 1946), American law professor at University of Michigan
William Lash Miller (1866–1940), Canadian chemistry professor
William P. Miller (college president), president of Weber State University, 1962–1972
William Richard Miller (born 1947), American professor of psychology at the University of New Mexico
William T. Miller (1911–1998), American chemistry professor

Sports

American football
Bill Miller (American football coach, born 1931) (1931–2006), head football coach at Southwest Texas State University
Bill Miller (American football coach, born 1956), college football coach
Bill Miller (wide receiver) (born 1940), wide receiver in the American Football League
Billy Miller (American football) (born 1977), American professional football player
Willie Miller (American football) (born 1947), American football player

Association football
Bill Miller (footballer, born 1890) (1890–?), English footballer (Brighton & Hove Albion)
Bill Miller (footballer, born 1908) (1908–1974), English footballer (Luton Town, Southport)
William Miller (1870s footballer) (died 1894), Scottish footballer (Third Lanark, Scotland national team)
William Miller (footballer, born 1875) (1875–1915), Scottish footballer
William Miller (footballer, born 1996), English footballer and former child actor
Willie Miller (born 1955), Scottish football player, manager and director (Aberdeen, Scotland national team)
Willie Miller (footballer, born 1895) (1895–1970), Scottish football player (Hibernian)
Willie Miller (footballer, born 1910) (1910–1978), Scottish football player (Partick Thistle, Burnley)
Willie Miller (footballer, born 1924) (1924–2005), Scottish goalkeeper (Celtic, Scotland national team)
Willie Miller (footballer, born 1969), Scottish football player (Hibernian)

Athletics
Bill Miller (athlete) (1930–2016), Olympian athlete in the javelin throw
Bill Miller (pole vault) (1912–2008), American Olympic pole vaulter

Australian rules football
Bill Miller (Australian footballer) (1936–1986), Australian rules footballer for Geelong
Billy Miller (Australian footballer) (1884–1970), Australian rules footballer for Geelong
William Miller (Australian footballer) (1881–1912), South Australian footballer for Norwood

Baseball
Bill Miller (outfielder) (1879–1957), Major League Baseball player
Bill Miller (right-handed pitcher) (1910–1982), Major League Baseball player
Bill Miller (left-handed pitcher) (1927–2003), Major League Baseball player
Bill Miller (umpire) (born 1967), Major League Baseball umpire

Basketball
Bill Miller (basketball) (1924–1991), American NBA player and college head coach (Elon University)
Willie Miller (basketball) (born 1977), professional basketball player of the Alaska Aces

Rowing
Will Miller (rower) (born 1984), American Olympic rower
William Miller (rower, born 1905) (1905–1985), American Olympic rower
William Miller (rower, born 1947), American Olympic rower

Other sports
Bill Miller (bowls) (1910–2004), American lawn bowler
Bill Miller (ice hockey) (1908–1986), Canadian professional hockey player
Bill Miller (lacrosse) (born c. 1967), American lacrosse player
Bill Miller (wrestler) (1927–1997), American professional wrestler
Billy Miller (water polo) (born 1988), Australian water polo player
Will Miller (rugby union) (born 1993), Australian rugby union player
William Miller (Australian athlete) (1846–1939), champion in boxing, fencing, wrestling and weight-lifting
William Miller (Canadian football) (1957–2019), running back in the Canadian Football League
William Miller (cricketer, born 1817), English cricketer
William Miller (cricketer, born 1905) (1905–1974), Australian cricketer
William Miller (golfer) (1839–?), Scottish amateur golfer

Writing and publishing
H. Bill Miller (1920–1961), mystery co-author with Bob Wade
William Miller (British publisher) (1769–1844)
William Miller (historian) (1864–1945), British expatriate journalist and medieval historian
William Miller (poet) (1810–1872), Scottish poet, writer of Wee Willie Winkie
William Miller (typographer) Scottish type-founder, working in Edinburgh from c.1808 and associated with Scotch Roman 
William Burke Miller (1904–1983), newspaper and radio journalist
William H. Miller (writer) (born 1948), maritime historian
William Henry Miller (book collector) (1789–1848), book collector and UK parliamentarian
William Lee Miller (1926–2012), American journalist and historian

Other fields
William Miller (cashier), Chief Cashier of the Bank of England, 1864–1866
William Miller (criminal) (1906–1931), American bank robber and Depression-era outlaw
William Miller, Lord Glenlee (1755–1846), Scottish advocate, law lord and landowner
William Christopher Miller (1898–c. 1976), British veterinarian
William Herbert Miller Jr. (1932–1988), philatelist of New York City
Willie Miller (urbanist) (born 1950), British urban planner

See also
William Millar (disambiguation)
William Mueller (disambiguation)